Enteromius catenarius is a species of cyprinid fish endemic to the Kouilou-Niari River system of the Republic of the Congo. This species can reach a maximum length of  SL. It is yellow to orange in color and has brown scales. It may be more widespread than currently known but further research is needed.

References 

Endemic fauna of the Republic of the Congo
Enteromius
Fish described in 1959
Taxa named by Max Poll
Taxa named by Jacques G. Lambert